The U.S. Post Office in Sycamore, Illinois is listed on the National Register of Historic Places as part of the Sycamore Historic District. The district was designated and listed in May 1978. It stands directly across the street from another key structure in the district, the Sycamore Public Library and cross-corner from the district's largest structure, the DeKalb County Courthouse.  It is open M-F from 8:30 am – 6:00 pm, Sat. from 9:00 am – 3:00 pm, and it is closed on Sunday.

See also
List of United States post offices

References 

Sycamore, Illinois
Buildings and structures in Sycamore Historic District
Historic district contributing properties in Illinois
Post office buildings on the National Register of Historic Places in Illinois